Mohsen Mohammed Al-Daeri (born 1965) is  a Yemeni military officer and the minister of defense; he was appointed to this position on 28 July 2022 and promoted to the rank of Lieutenant general. He previously served as deputy head of the Yemeni military joint operations.

Early life and education 

Mohsen Al-Daeri was born in 1965 in Al-Shoayb, a village in Jahaf District in Dhale Governorate. He received his basic and primary education in Al-Dhale governorate. He pursued his high education in Lahj governorate. He entered the Military College in Aden in 1983 and graduated with the rank of lieutenant in 1985. He got a diploma in Social Sciences, University of Aden in 1988.

Military education 

 Master in Military Sciences, The Command and Staff College, Sana'a, 2000
 War College Graduate Fellowship, 2008
 Brigade Commanders Course, Thulaya Military Institute, Aden,1996
 Battalions Commanders Course, Thulaya Military Institute, Aden,1993
 Bachelor in Military Sciences, Military College, Aden,1985

Main commands 

 Chief of Operations of the Air Defense Brigade, the Northwest Military Region, 2003–2010
 Chief of Staff of the 135th Infantry Brigade, the Northwest Military Region, 2010
 Commanders of the 122nd Infantry Brigade, Saada, 2010–2012
 Commander of the 14th Armored Brigade, Marib, 2012–2019
 Chief of the Staff of the Yemeni Armed Forces' Joint Operations, 2019
 Yemeni Defense Minister, 2022

References 

Yemeni generals
Yemeni military personnel of the Yemeni Civil War (2014–present)
Living people
Defence ministers of Yemen
Ministry of Defense (Yemen)
People from Dhale Governorate
1965 births
Second Maeen Cabinet